Westminster School is the more common name of The Royal College of St. Peter at Westminster in London, which is one of the original group of nine leading public schools in England as defined by the Public Schools Act 1868.

Westminster School may also refer to:
 In Australia
Westminster School, Adelaide, a private K–12 school in Adelaide, South Australia

 In the Philippines
Westminster High School (Manila)

In Sudan
The Westminster School (Port Sudan), a school in Port Sudan, Sudan

 In the United Arab Emerits 

 In the United Kingdom
Westminster Abbey Choir School
Westminster City School, a voluntary aided school in London, England
Westminster School, an independent school in London, England
Westminster Under School, a preparatory school in London, England
Westminster School of Art, a former art school in London, England

 In the United States
The Westminster Schools, a private secondary school in Atlanta, Georgia
Westminster Christian School, a private Reformed K–12 school in Miami, Florida
Westminster High School (Westminster, California)
Westminster High School (Westminster, Colorado)
Westminster High School (Westminster, Maryland)
Westminster School (Connecticut), a private boarding school in Simsbury, Connecticut
Westminster School (Oklahoma), a private school in Oklahoma City, Oklahoma
Westminster School (Annandale, Virginia), a private school, K–8, located in Annandale, VA
Westminster Schools of Augusta, a private school, PreK–12, located in Augusta, Georgia

See also
Westminster (disambiguation)